Bite of a Mango is a 2022 Canadian drama/comedy film written by Joanne Jansen and Ron Dias and directed by Dias in his directorial debut. The film stars Jayne Kamara, Ryan Rosery, Orville Cummings, Nathan Taylor, and Shawna Stewart.

The movie had its world premiere at the American Black Film Festival on June 18, 2022, and its Canadian premiere at the ReelWorld Film Festival.

Bite of a Mango was acquired by AllBlk, an AMC streaming platform set to release March 23, 2023.

Plot 
After a casual hook up between Jayne and Tray in the early stages of lockdown when Covid-19 was first introduced to the world, Jayne, a strikingly independent half-Nigerian half-Jamaican woman, is left feeling alone in dealing with an unplanned pregnancy. In Jayne’s absence, Tray seeks the friendship of an old flame only to realize how he truly feels about Jayne.
 
In addition to now having to divide their time between their friendships with Jayne and Tray, with the Black Lives Matter movement rising to new heights, Rowe and Chris find themselves on different ends of the spectrum of activism. As Chris becomes more of a leader in the space, Rowe starts dating someone white, and is left feeling like an outsider in his own community.

As the world changed with the Murder of George Floyd, Chris decides to create a space for Black people to be safe and talk. Rowe was insensitive to this as he still invited his White girlfriend, causing friction between everyone. 

Jayne soon learns how Tray really feels and decides to continue with the pregnancy without him until talking to her father to mend things for the child's sake. With new life, the foursome consider second chances and reconcile their differences to keep their group together.

Production 
Joanne Jansen and Ron Dias wrote the script in two days during the height of the COVID-19 pandemic in Canada, drawing inspiration with what was going in the world in 2020. It was filmed over five days during the pandemic. The team of four took all necessary precautions to ensure a safe environment while the rest of the industry was shut down.  In order to keep the budget under ten thousand dollars, Dias and Jansen wore multiple hats including editing, colouring, sound composing, cinematography and set decorating.

Cast
 Jayne Kamara as Jayne
 Ryan Rosery as Tray
 Orville Cummings as Rowe
 Nathan Taylor as Chris
 Shawna Stewart as Missy
 Yana Gold as Rebecca
 Bianca Nugara as Maya
 Dorren Lee as Dr. Leslie Taylor

Awards
At Reelworld, the film won the Audience Choice Award and Jayne Kamara won Outstanding actress in a feature film.

Reception 

The Toronto Star gave praise to the film as the first Toronto production to screen at the American Black Film Festival and be received with great reviews. Tickets for its premiere at Toronto's Reel World Film Festival were sold out in 3 days. The Toronto Star stated that the filmmakers will be the next big names of Toronto while adding a shot of the film. On October 15, Bite of a Mango was met with positive reviews and was given a standing ovation by over 300 people for capturing Toronto on the big screen in such an authentic way.

References

External links
 
 
 

2022 films
2022 directorial debut films
2022 comedy-drama films
Canadian comedy-drama films
Films set in 2020
Films set in Toronto
Films shot in Toronto
2020s English-language films
Black Canadian films